Bhaluka is an upazila of the Mymensingh District in Bangladesh. Bhaluka is one of the oldest small business hubs in the area.

Etymology
Bhaluka Upazila is named after the Bhaluka village and Bhaluka Bazar which is located in the union. There are three main theories behind its etymology:
 When British rule was firmly established, the indigo planters set up indigo factories in different places to satisfy their own interests. After setting up an indigo factory in the area (known as Neelkuthi), the indigo planters used to go out hunting from time to time. In the forest they faced tigers and bears. The word for bear in the Bengali language is ভালুক (Bhaluk) and so Bhaluka is considered a corruption of Bhaluk.
 As the revenue office (kachari bari) of the eastern bazaar was under the name of Bhawal's zamindar, it was known as Bhawal-er Kachari. Some have theorised that this was shortened to Bhaluka.
 As the area is home to the Koch, another theory is that Bhaluka was named after the tribal Koch chief Bhaluk Chand Mandal.

History

During the reign of the Palas and Senas, Bhaluka was under the administration of a samanta. It came under Muslim rule during the reign of Sultan Alauddin Husain Shah in the early fourteenth century.

Khan Saheb Abedullah Chowdhury was a notable zamindar of Bhaluka. He and his wife, Halimunnesa Chowdhurani, made notable contributions to the development of Bhaluka. Under the orders of Abedullah Chowdhury and the help of Mansur Ali Khan, Zayed Ali and Zayed Khan, the Bhaluka Bazar (marketplace) was established. The Bhaluka Bazar area however was divided into two parts as two different zamindars (landowners) were in control. The western bazaar was under Maharaja Shashikanta of the Muktagacha Zamindari. The entirety of Bhaluka along with the eastern bazaar was under the Bhawal Zamindari. In the forests of the former part, there was a mazar whose custodian was Innat Faqir, the father of Wahid Ali Faqir. There was a courthouse in the eastern bazaar, and so rent was collected for the Zamindar of Bhawal. The village next to the marketplace also came to be known as Bhaluka. Separating from the Gafargaon Thana, Bhaluka was made its own administrative thana of Mymensingh Subdivision in 1917. Maulvi AKM Nazir Hosain was made the Sub-Registrar of Bhaluka.

Their son Aftabuddin Chowdhury was a member of the National Assembly for the term 1965-1969 from the Pakistan Muslim League, and later an MP in Bangladesh from the same party. The Dhaka-Mymensingh highway was built in the regime of Ayub Khan because of the proposal given by Chowdhury.

During the Bangladesh Liberation War of 1971, Afsar Uddin Ahmed (Sub-sector Commander of Sector 11) collected arms and ammunition, and founded the Afsar Bahini - challenging the Pakistan Army. Mohammad Abdul Mannan, studying Civil Engineering and also the vice president of Rajshahi Engineering College student wing then, was the first to collect three units of 303 rifles from nearest thana and request Afsar Uddin to train all. Shah Ali Akbar was also a freedom fighter of Bhaluka. Along with Mohammad Abdul Mannan and Afsar Uddin Ahmed, he organized mukti bahini (freedom fighter) at Bhaluka. The Pakistan Army established military camps at Mallikbari, Ashka, Tamat, and Bhaluka Bazar. A memorial monument was established in Bhaluka Bus Stand. Bhaluka Thana was upgraded to an upazila in August 1983.

In 2010, work started for the Kadigarh National Park located in Palgaon, Kachina Union.

Geography
Bhaluka has a total area of 444.05 km2. It is bounded by Fulbaria and Trishal Upazilas on the north, Sreepur Upazila on the south, Gaffargaon Upazila on the east and Sakhipur and Ghatail Upazilas on the west. The main rivers flowing over the upazila are Sutia, Khiru, Lalti, and Bajua.

Demographics
According to the 2011 Bangladesh census, Bhaluka had a population of 430,320. Males constituted 50.46% of the population and females 49.54%. Muslims formed 95.45% of the population, Hindus 4.04%, Christians 0.34% and others 0.17%. Bhaluka had a literacy rate of 49.12% for the population 7 years and above.

As of the 1991 Bangladesh census, Bhaluka had a population of 264,991 in 53,222 households. Males constituted 51.08% of the population, and females 48.92%. The Upazila's 18 year old and up population is 137,860.

Bhaluka had an average literacy rate of 41.10% (7+ years), and a national average literacy rate of 32.4%.

Administration

Bhaluka, formed as a Thana in 1917, was turned into an upazila in 1983.

Bhaluka Upazila is divided into Bhaluka Municipality and 11 union parishads: Bhaluka, Birunia, Dakatia, Dhitpur, Habirbari, Kachina, Mallikbari, Meduari, Rajoi, Uthura, and Varadoba. The union parishads are subdivided into 87 mauzas and 110 villages.

Bhaluka Municipality is subdivided into 9 wards and 18 mahallas.

Upazila chairmen

Education
Bhaluka Pilot High School is said to be the oldest and most famous school in Bhaluka, founded in 1948 by Aftab Uddin Chowdhury. Besides, many schools and madrasahs were established by the Chowdhury family. They also gave utmost importance to girls education and established Halimunnesa Chowdhurani Memorial Girls School.
Batazor M.U. Founder of Dakhil Madrasah - Alhaj Moslem Uddin Sarkar.

Bhaluka Govt. College was founded on 13 June 1972. Founder Mr. Mostofa M A Matin(MP). Land donor Dr. Md. Abdul Khaleque and M. Md.Amir Ali.

Demographics
Majority of Bhaluka is inhabited by ethnic Bengalis, although a minority of the population belong to the indigenous Garo, Rajbongshi and Koch Mandai tribes. The Koch can be found in Uthura and Dakatiya Unions and are known to have the surname Varman.

Bhaluka has a strong Sunni Muslim majority with a large Hindu minority population numbering over 13 thousand. Other minority religions include Buddhism, Christianity and tribal religions.

Economy

Bhaluka has a number of tourist attractions such as the historical mosques of Neshaiganj and Bhaluka Bazar, Tepantar Shooting Spot, Pamwel Garden, Dream Holiday Resort and Paradise Point. The Nilkuthi indigo factory dates back to the British colonial period. In addition to these, the mosques at Uthura and Mallikbari are also quite notable. The Kadigarh National Park is also a very popular tourist site.

There is a crocodile breeding centre in Hatiber, Mutalib Miah's Arabian date cultivation farm in Paragaon, Mallikbari orange farm and a rabbit breeding centre in Habirbari. By 2014, there is a possibility of exporting 4,000 crocodiles every year and the one at Hatiber is crucial to this. The income will be three to 40 million dollars. Among them, several European countries have made official proposals to import crocodiles from Bangladesh.

Notable people
 Aftabuddin Chowdhury, politician
 Arifin Shuvoo, film actor and TV personality
 Kazim Uddin Ahmed, politician
 Mohammed Amanullah, cardiologist

References

Bhaluka Upazila